Midlothian South, Tweeddale and Lauderdale is a constituency of the Scottish Parliament (Holyrood) covering parts of the council areas of Midlothian and Scottish Borders. Created for the 2011 election, it elects one Member of the Scottish Parliament (MSP) by the plurality (first past the post) method of election. It is one of nine constituencies in the South Scotland electoral region, which elects seven additional members, in addition to nine constituency MSPs, to produce a form of proportional representation for the region as a whole.

The constituency covers parts of the former constituencies of Midlothian and Tweeddale, Ettrick and Lauderdale. The remainder of Midlothian council area lies within the constituency of Midlothian North and Musselburgh, whilst the remainder of Scottish Borders forms the Ettrick, Roxburgh and Berwickshire constituency.

Electoral region 

The other eight constituencies of the South Scotland region are Ayr, Carrick, Cumnock and Doon Valley, Clydesdale, Dumfriesshire, East Lothian, Ettrick, Roxburgh and Berwickshire, Galloway and West Dumfries and Kilmarnock and Irvine Valley.

The region covers the Dumfries and Galloway council area, part of the East Ayrshire council area, part of the East Lothian council area, part of the Midlothian council area, the Scottish Borders council area, the South Ayrshire council area and part of the South Lanarkshire council area.

Midlothian North and Musselburgh, which covers the rest of Midlothian, is part of the Lothian region.

Constituency boundaries and council area 

Since the 2011 Scottish Parliament election, the constituency of Midlothian South, Tweeddale and Lauderdale has been formed from the following electoral wards:

In full:
Galashiels and District (Scottish Borders)
Leaderdale and Melrose (Scottish Borders)
Midlothian South (Midlothian)
Penicuik (Midlothian)
Tweeddale East (Scottish Borders)
Tweeddale West( Scottish Borders)
In part
Midlothian West (in Midlothian, and shared with Midlothian North and Musselburgh constituency)

Members of the Scottish Parliament

Election results

2020s

2010s

Footnotes

External links

Scottish Parliament constituencies and regions from 2011
Politics of Midlothian
Constituencies of the Scottish Parliament
Constituencies established in 2011
2011 establishments in Scotland
Penicuik
Politics of the Scottish Borders
Peebles
Innerleithen
Galashiels
Melrose, Scottish Borders
Earlston
Lauder